Kevin Michael Connolly (born March 20, 1962) is a Canadian poet, editor, and teacher who was born in Biloxi, Mississippi and grew up in Maple, Ontario. Connolly has served as an editor for presses such as ECW Press, Coach House Press, McClelland & Stewart, and he is currently the poetry editor at House of Anansi Press. He has edited and published more than 60 full-length poetry collections, many of them debuts. 

Connolly's book, Drift, won the 2005 Trillium Award, and his fourth book, Revolver, was shortlisted for the 2009 Griffin Poetry Prize. He was the recipient of the 2015 Artist Award from the KM Hunter Foundation.

Biography

Connolly graduated from York University in 1985 with a Bachelor of Arts with honors and currently resides in Toronto with his partner, Canadian writer Gil Adamson. After leaving York University, Connolly co-founded what! magazine with fellow York graduate, Jason Sherman. What! magazine published from 1985 to 1993 and was considered influential. Connolly incorporates the strategies and technique of language poetry in his work and his poetry has appeared in a number of small presses, including The Monika Schnarre story and Deathcake. In 1998, Eye weekly (a Toronto Star newspaper based division) hired Connolly to write columns on poetry, food, and theater, but by 2004, he left to start working as an editor for Coach House Press.

Works and criticisms

In 1995, Connolly released his first collection of work, Asphalt cigar (coach House Press), which was nominated for the League of Canadian poets’ Gerald Lampert Award for best first book of poetry. Upon releasing Asphalt cigar (1995), Connolly was one of six writers featured in Blues and True Concussions (House of Anansi Press, 1996), an anthology of new Toronto poets. In 2002, Connolly released his second collection of work, titled Happyland (ECW Press) but did not gain greater recognition until the release of his 2005 collection, Drift (House of Anansi press) which won the Trillium Book Award for poetry. Connolly’s second and third collections were both successful but were commonly criticized as showing too much of his process and ‘’lacking cohesive shape". In 2008, Connolly released his fourth collection of work, titled Revolver (House of Anansi press), which was nominated for the 2009 Griffin Poetry Prize. Connolly was a runner up for the Griffin poetry prize alongside writer Jeramy Dodds’ poem, titled crabwise to the hounds, which Connolly himself edited. Connolly’s collection of poems, Revolver, was well received, and he was noted for his use of humor in his writing.

Contributions to Canadian poetry

Connolly has taught workshops and held educational competitions that focus on the process of poetry writing. During the 1990s, Connolly published the early work of Canadians such as Lynn Crosbie, Gary Barwin, Daniel Jones, Stuart Ross and Gil Adamson, in a collection titled Pink Dog chapbook. He served as a poetry judge at the 2006 great Canadian literary hunt and his poem, titled Sundial, was featured in the 40th anniversary edition of This Magazine. His poem, titled Chain, from the 2005 Drift collection was included in a collection of works titled 30 in 30, a collection created to celebrate National Poetry Month.

Works
 Asphalt Cigar (1995)
 Happyland (2002)
 Drift (2005)(Winner of the Trillium Book Award)
 Revolver (2008) (shortlisted for the 2009 Canadian Griffin Poetry Prize)

References

External links
Kevin Connolly Griffin Poetry Prize biography
 Kevin Connolly Griffin Poetry Prize Reading
He practises poetry without prejudice – Profile in the National Post

1962 births
Living people
20th-century Canadian poets
20th-century Canadian male writers
Canadian male poets
21st-century Canadian poets
Canadian book editors
Writers from Toronto
21st-century Canadian male writers